Benjamin H. Bratton (born 1968) is an American Philosopher of Technology known for his work spanning social theory, computer science, design, artificial intelligence, and for his writing on the geopolitical implications of what he terms "planetary scale computation".

He is Professor of Visual Arts at the University of California, San Diego (UCSD) and author and editor of numerous books and essays

Early life
Bratton was born in Los Angeles, California in 1968 and holds a PhD in the sociology of technology from the University of California, Santa Barbara.

Career 

Since 2009, he is Professor of Visual Arts at University of California, San Diego. Since 2014, he has been Professor of Philosophy of Design at the European Graduate School in Saas-Fee, Switzerland. From 2019-22 he was visiting professor at NYU Shanghai. Prior to teaching at UCSD, Bratton taught at the Southern California Institute of Architecture in Los Angeles from 2001 to 2010 and is now a distinguished visiting professor. He taught in the Department of Design Media Arts at the University of California, Los Angeles (UCLA) from 2003 to 2008. He founded University of California, San Diego's Speculative Design undergraduate major.

In 2016, he succeeded Rem Koolhaas as program director of the Strelka Institute, a Moscow-based think tank and post-graduate program in architecture, media, and design. He directed two three-year programs, The New Normal  and The Terraforming. At the outbreak of the 2022 Russian Invasion of Ukraine the institute indefinitely suspended all programs in protest.

As of 2022, Bratton is the Director of a new research program on the speculative philosophy of computation called Antikythera, incubated by the Berggruen Institute with support from One Project.

Publications

The Revenge of the Real: Politics for a Post-Pandemic World 
In 2021, Verso Books published Bratton's book on the COVID-19 pandemic based on his essay "18 Lessons for Quarantine Urbanism". The book argues that the pandemic demonstrates on ongoing crisis of governance in the West, and that technological capacity to respond to planetary crises outstrips the social and cultural capacity for collective self-organization. The book discusses concepts of the epidemiological view of society, cultural controversies over masks, and points toward a positive biopolitics in sharp contrast with the work of Giorgio Agamben.

The Stack: On Software and Sovereignty 
The Stack: On Software and Sovereignty was published by MIT Press in late 2015. The book challenges traditional ideas of sovereignty centered around the nation-state and develops a theory of geopolitics that accounts for sovereignty in terms of planetary-scale computation at various scales. Its two core arguments are that planetary-scale computation “distorts and deforms traditional Westphalian logics of political geography” and creates new territories in its own image, and that different scales of computing technology can be understood as forming an “accidental megastructure” that resembles a multi-layer network architecture stack, what Bratton calls “The Stack.” The Stack is described as a platform. Bratton argues that platforms represent a technical and institutional model equivalent to states or markets but reducible to neither. Bratton refers to the book as “a design brief” suggesting that the layers of this structure are modular available to innovation and replacement.

Dispute Plan to Prevent Future Luxury Constitution 
His 2015 book Dispute Plan to Prevent Future Luxury Constitution was published by e-flux Journal and Sternberg Press in 2015. It launched publicly at the 2016 edition of the Transmediale festival in Berlin. In the description by Sternberg Press the book is " kaleidoscopic theory-fiction" which "links the utopian fantasies of political violence with the equally utopian programs of security and control."

Essays 
"On Geoscapes & Google Caliphate: Except #Mumbai" examines the correspondence of political theology and planetary computation as modes of political geography.

His lecture "Surviving the Interface: the Envelopes, Membranes and Borders of Deep Cosmopolitics" considers the emergence of new forms of sovereignty derived from shared digital and urban infrastructures, and the challenges they pose to conventional understandings of architectural partitions and national borders.

In his article, "iPhone City (v.2005)" Bratton was early to demonstrate the impact that cinematic user interfaces for mobile social media would have on urban design. 

His current work develops a political theory of planetary-scale computation and draws from disparate sources, from Paul Virilio, Michel Serres, and Carl Schmitt, to Alan Turing, Google Earth, and IPv6. 

In 2017, Bratton completed The New Normal an ebook for Strelka Press, which outlines the radical effects that technology is having on our world and describes the emerging forms of city that we should now be designing for.

The essay "Planetary Sapience" (2021) published in Noema compares the violent evolution of natural intelligence with the emergence of synthetic intelligence and considers their interrelation in terms of an understanding of intelligence as part of geological history and planetary formation. He contrasts this with the popular notions of Gaia and the Noosphere.

"The Model is the Message" (2022) co-authored with Blaise Aguera y Arcas, a VP of Artificial Intelligence at Google, examined recent controversies over large language models and the tendency to misattribute sentience to machines.

Personal life 
Bratton lives in La Jolla, California and has a son, Lucien, with writer Bruna Mori. He is the half-brother of Jamie Stewart of the band Xiu Xiu.

References

External links

 Bratton.info. – Benjamin H. Bratton's personal website
Academia.edu Bratton books and articles
 D:GP The Center for Design and Geopolitics
 Bratton's page at the Department of Visual Arts, UCSD
 "Accidental Geopolitics"-Interview – Bratton speaking at The Guardian Activate Summit 2011 in New York (28 April 2011).
 "The Program is Not on The Floor" at Southern California Institute of Architecture (28 February 2011).
 "Surviving the Interface" (full transcript) 
 video at University of Michigan (17 November 2010).
 "Ambivalence and/or Utopia"  at University of Michigan Taubman School of Architecture (20 March 2010).
 "Peak Oil Apophenia" at Parsons/ The New School (12 March 2011).
 Bratton Speaking at Postopolis!LA  reported by City of Sound (11 April 2009).
 "On Geoscapes & Google Caliphate: Except #Mumbai" in Theory, Culture & Society – SAGE Journals Online.
 "The Digital Civil Society in a Multipolar World" – Carnegie Moscow Center (18 October 2010).

1968 births
Living people
American sociologists
UCLA School of the Arts and Architecture faculty
University of California, Santa Barbara alumni
Southern California Institute of Architecture faculty
University of California, San Diego faculty
Writers from Los Angeles
Accelerationism